Tiger moth may refer to:

Biology
 Tiger moths, certain moths of the subfamily Arctiinae
 Arctiini, a tribe of tiger moths in the moth family Erebidae

Aircraft
 de Havilland Tiger Moth, an aerobatic and trainer tailwheel biplane
 de Havilland DH.71 Tiger Moth, an earlier monoplane produced by de Havilland
 Fisher R-80 Tiger Moth, a homebuilt aircraft
 RagWing RW22 Tiger Moth, a homebuilt aircraft

Fiction
 Tiger Moth, a fictional biplane in Thomas & Friends
 Tiger Moth, a supervillainess from "The Resurrection of Ra's al Ghul" by DC Comics